Brčevo (Macedonian Cyrillic: Брчево) is a small village located near Struga, in the Struga municipality in the western region of North Macedonia.

The village was once a thriving community but has in the last 30 years lost the majority of its population to the commercial centres on it, such as Struga.  The village is still visited regularly by it previous residents and related family for religious holidays and for the maintenance of the village housing.

Villages in Struga Municipality
Albanian communities in North Macedonia